M. L. Snowden is an American sculptor.

Work
Her works, largely in lost wax-cast bronze, explore geological phenomena and human figuration.

Snowden was a recipient of the Alex J. Ettl Grant. and Japan's 4th International Rodin Competition.

Her commissions include the Altar Angels in the Cathedral of Our Lady of the Angels in Los Angeles, the Glendale Police Memorial,  The Ira Kaufman Memorial at the Centinela Hospital Medical Center, and the Albert Gersten Memorial.

References

Living people
American sculptors
Year of birth missing (living people)